Italy national athletics team competed at the 2022 World Athletics Championships in Eugene, Oregon, from 15 to 24 July.

Medalists

Placing table
Italy team finished in 12th position in placing table.

Team
On 4 July 2022, the technical commissioner of the Italian national team Antonio La Torre issued the list of the athletes called up for the Eugene World Championships, 60 athletes (29 men and 31 women).

Results

Men
Track and road events

Field events

Women
Track and road events

Field events

Mixed

See also
Italy at the 2022 European Athletics Championships

References

External links
 

Nations at the 2022 World Athletics Championships
World Championships in Athletics
Italy at the World Championships in Athletics